Route 49 is a state highway in the southern part of the U.S. state of New Jersey. It runs  from an interchange with the New Jersey Turnpike, Interstate 295 (I-295), and U.S. Route 40 (US 40) in Deepwater, Salem County, southeast to Route 50 and County Route 557 in Tuckahoe, Cape May County. The route serves Salem, Cumberland, Atlantic, and Cape May Counties, passing through rural areas and the communities of Salem, Bridgeton, and Millville along the way. It is a two-lane, undivided road for most of its length.

Route 49 was established in 1927 to run from Salem to Clermont, running along its present alignment between Salem and Millville, following current Route 47 between Millville and South Dennis, and running along present-day Route 83 between South Dennis and Clermont. It replaced  a branch of pre-1927 Route 6 between Salem and Bridgeton and a part of pre-1927 Route 15 between Bridgeton and South Dennis. In 1953, Route 49 was routed onto its current alignment, replacing a part of Route 44 between Salem and Deepwater and following the former alignment of Route 47 between Millville and Tuckahoe. In the 1960s, a freeway was planned for Route 49 between Deepwater and Millville; it was never built. In the 2000s, many improvements have been or are being made to bridges along Route 49.

Route description

Salem County

Route 49 heads southwest on Broadway from an interchange with the New Jersey Turnpike, I-295, and US 40 in the community of Deepwater in Pennsville Township, Salem County near the Delaware Memorial Bridge. North of here, the road continues to the north as US 130. Route 49 passes through residential and commercial areas of Pennsville, turning to the south-southeast and passing west of Pennsville Memorial High School. The route intersects County Route 630 (Fort Mott Road) before it continues into farmland. Route 49 then intersects the southern terminus of County Route 551 (Hook Road and County Route 632 (Lighthouse Road). It crosses the Salem River into Salem and becomes Front Street.

In Salem, the route intersects County Route 657 (Griffith Street) at a crossing of the SMS Rail Lines' Salem Branch line and makes a right turn. It turns left onto Broadway and forms the main business district of the town. In downtown Salem, Route 49 intersects County Route 625 (Chestnut Street), the southern terminus of Route 45 (Market Street), and County Route 665 (Walnut Street). It crosses County Route 658 (Keasbey Street/York Street) and enters Quinton Township, becoming Main Street and heading into agricultural areas. Route 49 heads east, meeting County Route 650 (Hancocks Bridge Road) and County Route 653 (Action Station Road). It crosses the Alloway Creek into the community of Quinton, where it intersects the southern terminus of County Route 581 (Quinton Alloway Road) and County Route 654 (Sickler Street). The route leaves Quinton and intersects County Route 626 (Jericho Road), continuing southeast into wooded areas, where Route 49 crosses County Route 667 (Pecks Corner Road) and County Route 647 (Telegraph Road/Jericho Road).

Cumberland County
Route 49 crosses a stream, Sarah Run, into Stow Creek Township, Cumberland County and heads into farmland as Shiloh Pike. Here, it crosses County Route 624 (Jericho Road) and County Route 617 (Columbia Highway). The route then intersects County Route 635 (Old Cohansey Road) and continues south along the border of Stow Creek Township to the west and Hopewell Township to the east, entering Shiloh at the intersection with Mill Road. In Shiloh, Route 49 meets County Route 620 (Roadstown Road) and County Route 753 (East Avenue/West Avenue) in the center of town and heads southeast, crossing County Route 695 (Maple Avenue/Randolph Road). The route enters Hopewell Township and intersects County Route 661 (Barretts Run Road).

Past this intersection, Route 49 enters a more suburban landscape, crossing County Route 621 (W. Park Drive). The route enters Bridgeton and becomes West Broad Street. In Bridgeton, it intersects County Route 607 (West Avenue), County Route 650 (Fayette Street), and County Route 697 (Atlantic Street). Route 49 crosses the Cohansey River and comes to an intersection with Pearl Street, which heads to the north as Route 77 and to the south as County Route 609. Past Pearl Street, Route 49 intersects County Route 670 (East Commerce Street/Buckshutem Road) and crosses a Winchester and Western Railroad line as it continues to the east on East Commerce Street. It crosses County Route 638 (N. Burlington Road) and enters Fairfield Township.

Route 49 continues east through a mix of woods and farms, intersecting County Route 553 (Gouldtown-Woodruff Road) and County Route 675 (Fordville-Gouldtown Road).  It enters Millville and becomes Main Street, intersecting County Route 682 (Sugarman Avenue) and County Route 634 (Nabb Avenue). It intersects three more county routes, County Route 714 (Morias Avenue), County Route 625 (Hogbin Road), and County Route 712 (Reick Road), before heading into the city. It intersects County Route 608 (Carmel Road) and County Route 698 (Beech Street), County Route 667 (Sharp Street), and County Route 610 (Brandriff Avenue) before meeting County Route 555 (Cedar Street), which it forms a concurrency with. The route crosses the Maurice River and enters downtown Millville, where it intersects Route 47 (Second Street). Past Route 47, County Route 555 splits from Route 49 by turning north onto Third Street. Route 49 heads east through the eastern part of Millville, crossing a Winchester and Western Railroad line and intersecting County Route 678 (Wade Boulevard) before reaching an interchange with Route 55. Past Route 55, Route 49 heads southeast into woodland and crosses into Maurice River Township.  In Maurice River Township, Route 49 intersects County Route 671 (Union Road), County Route 646 (Port Elizabeth-Cumberland Road), and County Route 644 (Hesstown Road). Route 49 eventually forms the border of Maurice River Township to the north and Upper Township, Cape May County to the south.

Atlantic and Cape May counties
Route 49 crosses the Tuckahoe River into Estell Manor, Atlantic County. It runs a short distance to the north of the Tuckahoe River and intersects County Route 649 (Aetna Avenue) and County Route 666 (Cape May Avenue) at Head of the River Church. The route crosses the Tuckahoe River into Upper Township, Cape May County and intersects the eastern terminus of County Route 548 (Tuckahoe Road), heading to the east. It intersects County Route 632 (Marshallville Road) and then comes to County Route 617 (Woodbine Road), which heads south to provide access to County Route 557. Route 49 continues east into Tuckahoe, where it comes to a bridge over the Beesleys Point Secondary railroad line operated by the Cape May Seashore Lines railroad and intersects County Route 659 (Railroad Avenue) before it ends at Route 50 and County Route 557.

History
The road from Millville to the east end of Bridgeton was maintained by the Bridgeton and Millville Turnpike, chartered in 1854. From the west end of Bridgeton to the Salem-Cumberland line, then called Marlborough, was built by the Shiloh Turnpike Company, chartered in 1866. From there to Quinton's Bridge, the road was maintained by the Marlborough and Quinton's Bridge Turnpike Company, chartered in 1864. The company was in business by at least 1920.

Route 49 was legislated in the 1927 New Jersey state highway renumbering to run from Route 45 in Salem to Route 4 (now U.S. Route 9) in Clermont.  The route replaced a branch of pre-1927 Route 6 between Salem and Bridgeton and a part of pre-1927 Route 15 between Bridgeton and South Dennis. A spur route of Route 49, Route S49, was created in 1927 to run from Route 49 in South Dennis to Route 4 in Rio Grande along the remainder of pre-1927 Route 15. Route S49 was extended to Wildwood in 1938. In the 1953 New Jersey state highway renumbering, Route 49 was extended west along what was a part of Route 44 to Deepwater to end at U.S. Route 40 and U.S. Route 130 near the Delaware Memorial Bridge. The eastern part of the route was realigned to head from Millville east to Route 50 in Tuckahoe, replacing what had been the southern part of Route 47. Meanwhile, Route 47 was realigned to head south from Millville, replacing Route 49 from Millville to South Dennis and the length of Route S49. The portion of Route 49 from South Dennis to Clermont became Route 83.

A freeway was proposed for Route 49 in the early 1960s, running from Interstate 295 and U.S. Route 40 at the Delaware Memorial Bridge to Route 55 in Millville. However, this freeway was canceled by 1967 as it closely paralleled the planned Route 60 freeway, which itself was never built.

In the 2000s, construction has occurred to replace many bridges along Route 49. The drawbridge over the Salem River was replaced by a fixed span in the mid-2000s. On October 1, 2008, the bridge over the railroad line in Tuckahoe was closed for reconstruction and reopened in June 2009. The bridge over the Cohansey River in Bridgeton was also reconstructed. Construction on this bridge started in October 2008 and was completed in July 2009.

Major intersections

See also

References

External links

NJ State Highways: 41-54 - Route 49
New Jersey Roads: Route 49
New Jersey Highway Ends: Route 49
NJ 49 Freeway (unbuilt)
Enlarged view of road jurisdiction at the confluence of I-295, US 40, US 130, NJ 49, NJ 140 and the New Jersey Turnpike near Carneys Point Township
Speed Limits for Route 49

049
Transportation in Atlantic County, New Jersey
Transportation in Cape May County, New Jersey
Transportation in Cumberland County, New Jersey
Transportation in Salem County, New Jersey